Robert Icke  (born 29 November 1986) is an English writer and theatre director. He has been referred to as the "great hope of British theatre."

He is best known for his play The Doctor, and his modern adaptations of classic texts, including versions of Oresteia, Mary Stuart, and 1984, devised with Duncan Macmillan.

Biography

Early career
Born in Stockton-on-Tees to a non-theatrical family, he was taken to see a production of Richard III starring Kenneth Branagh as a teenager, which inspired him to take up writing and directing. He then founded a theatre company, Arden Theatre, and directed a series of shows at Arc Theatre over a five-year period between 2003 and 2008. He studied at Ian Ramsey Church of England School, Queen Elizabeth Sixth Form College and then studied English at King's College, Cambridge, where he was taught by Anne Barton.

Mentored by Michael Grandage through his early career, he worked as an Assistant and associate director to Thea Sharrock, Michael Attenborough and Trevor Nunn.

Headlong
In 2010, Icke replaced Ben Power as associate director at Rupert Goold's company Headlong. His interview for the post involved him giving a critique of Goold's production of Enron. He first worked alongside Goold on the site-specific Decade at St Katharine's Docks. He then directed touring productions of Romeo and Juliet, the first production of Boys by Ella Hickson and 1984, written and directed with Duncan Macmillan, which began as a tour at Nottingham Playhouse in 2013 and after an extended further life, opened on Broadway in 2017.

Almeida Theatre
In 2013, Icke left Headlong to take up a post as associate director at the Almeida Theatre. His work there began with the Almeida transfer of his Headlong 1984 in early 2014, which transferred to the Playhouse Theatre in the West End later that year, before transferring to Broadway in 2017. In summer 2014, he directed the European premiere of Mr. Burns, a Post-Electric Play by Anne Washburn, which provoked a violently divided critical reaction. In early 2015, he directed Tobias Menzies in The Fever in a site-specific production in a hotel room in Mayfair.

The show that marked Icke as a major British talent was his 2015 Oresteia, the opening production of Goold and Icke's 'Almeida Greek' season of Greek tragedy. A free adaptation of Aeschylus' original running at nearly four hours with three intermissions, Icke added a self-penned prologue to the Aeschylus text concerning the sacrifice of Iphigenia: a "70-minute prequel that dramatises both what led up to that sacrifice and the act itself", which critic Dominic Maxwell dubbed "a masterpiece". Oresteia received rave reviews, won Icke several awards, and transferred to the West End.

Icke followed this in 2016 with his own adaptations of Uncle Vanya, starring Paul Rhys, and Mary Stuart, in which Juliet Stevenson and Lia Williams tossed a coin to alternate the two central roles of Mary Stuart and Elizabeth I. Mary Stuart transferred to the West End in 2018, opening to rave reviews.

After several months of rumours, Andrew Scott played Hamlet in Icke's production at the Almeida in early 2017. The production, which presented a Scandi-noir surveillance state, received rave reviews and transferred to the Harold Pinter Theatre, produced by Sonia Friedman. Hamlet was filmed and broadcast on BBC Two on Easter Saturday 2018.

In summer 2019, Icke stepped down from his Almeida role after six years to focus on his freelance career. The Doctor, which premiered at the Almeida Theatre on August 10, 2019,  was his final production as the associate director of the Almeida, and won the Evening Standard's Award for Best Director in 2019.

Internationaal Theater Amsterdam 
In 2018, Icke opened his new adaptation of Sophocles' Oedipus for Ivo van Hove's company Toneelgroep Amsterdam, starring Hans Kesting and Marieke Heebink. This production was selected for the Dutch Theatre Festival 2018 and was performed at the Edinburgh International Festival in 2019. Following this, his sequel to A Doll's House, Children of Nora, opened in Amsterdam in 2020.

In 2020, Icke was announced as the first Ibsen Artist in Residence at ITA, supported by the Philip Loubser Foundation, which committed him to making productions with the company from 2020 to 2022.

In 2021, Icke's play The Doctor premiered at ITA to a positive reception,  and in 2022, his new production Judas premiered with the company.

Other work 
Icke made his National Theatre debut with The Red Barn, starring Mark Strong and Elizabeth Debicki in 2016.

Icke's text of his adaptations of 1984, Oresteia, Uncle Vanya, Mary Stuart, The Wild Duck and his 'performance text' of Hamlet are published by Oberon Books.

In March 2019, Icke won the Kurt Hübner award for the German adaptation of Oresteia.

Philosophy
Icke has said that, in his work on classics, he searches for a return "to the impulse of the original play, to clear away the accumulated dust of its performance history. So much of great drama was profoundly troubling when it was first done. The word radical actually means to go back to the root. They rioted at Ibsen's A Doll’s House...Audiences shouldn't be allowed to feel nothing."

He has described his philosophy of adaptation aslike using a foreign plug. You are in a country where your hairdryer won't work when you plug it straight in. You have to find the adaptor which will let the electricity of now flow into the old thing and make it function.Icke has also spoken about the importance of attracting younger audiences to the theatre, describing theatre's elderly audience as "a big problem ...the industry’s going to have to address and sort out because otherwise we’re dead. In 50 or 60 years, there will be no audience." He courted controversy in 2016 by admitting that he thought audiences should leave plays in the interval if they found them boring.

Sarah Crompton has written of Icke's methods for initiating projects, "he finds an actor he wants to collaborate with and then they discuss the play that actor wants to perform", noting "the way he is quietly building relationships with an entire group of actors and bringing them back to work on successive projects." Icke tends to work with the same performers (a group that Natasha Tripney has dubbed "Team Icke") including repeat collaborations with Lia Williams, Tobias Menzies, Juliet Stevenson, Jessica Brown Findlay, Luke Thompson, Lorna Brown, Daniel Rabin, Rudi Dharmalingham, Joshua Higgott, and Angus Wright.

Critical response 
Lyn Gardner, in The Guardian, was the first mainstream critic to praise Icke's work. Reviewing his Headlong Romeo and Juliet, she wrote From its opening moments, when a digital clock starts to count the minutes, Icke offers a story in which elements of time and fate are compressed and heightened. In places it's like Sliding Doors, suggesting alternative scenarios... It employs the cross-cutting techniques of movies and TV with startling aplomb, and plays on the drama's presentiments of disaster through dreams and hallucinations... It's terrific, and hails the arrival of some thrilling young actors and an impressive new director.Though he has failed to satisfy some of the conservative broadsheet critics, such as Dominic Cavendish, Icke has found favour with others, including Susannah Clapp in The Observer, who described him as "one of the most important forces in today’s theatre."

Icke's work, according to Megan Vaughan, "is a sign that the UK’s once stuffy middle-class theatre culture is waking up to more exciting and less prescriptive techniques."

Icke has been praised for successfully balancing technology and artistry in his work. Quentin Letts in The Sunday Times states, "Icke shows are never boring to watch. At a mere 32, he has become the most skilled (or perhaps least irritating) proponent of the ambient-noise/video-screen brigade. His Hamlet had CCTV in the corridors of Elsinore, and in his Mary Stuart, the two main actresses decided only at the start of each performance which of them would play which part. With other directors, this sort of thing can feel forced. With Icke, there is usually enough artistic truthfulness to get you over any grumpiness."

Work 
The Doctor adapted by Robert Icke from Professor Bernhardi by Arthur Schnitzler, Almeida Theatre (2019) and West End (2020)
The Crucible by Arthur Miller, Theater Basel (2019)
The Wild Duck after Henrik Ibsen, Almeida Theatre (2018)
Oedipus by Sophocles, Toneelgroep Amsterdam (2018)
 Hamlet by Shakespeare, Almeida Theatre and Harold Pinter Theatre (2017), Park Avenue Armory (2020)
 Mary Stuart by Schiller (adapted by Robert Icke), Almeida Theatre (2016) and Duke of York's Theatre (2018)
 The Red Barn by Simenon (adapted by David Hare), National Theatre (2016)
 Uncle Vanya by Chekhov (adapted by Robert Icke), Almeida Theatre (2016)
 Oresteia by Aeschylus (adapted by Robert Icke), Almeida Theatre and Trafalgar Studios (2015), Schauspiel Stuttgart (2018), Park Avenue Armory (2020)
 The Fever by Wallace Shawn, Almeida Theatre (site-specific) (2015)
 Mr Burns by Anne Washburn, Almeida Theatre (2014)
 1984 by George Orwell, devised with Duncan Macmillan, Nottingham Playhouse (2013), UK and World Tours, Almeida Theatre (2014), Playhouse Theatre (2014, 2015, 2016), Hudson Theatre (2017)
 The Alchemist by Ben Jonson, Liverpool Playhouse (2012)
 Boys by Ella Hickson, Headlong, Soho Theatre (2012)
 Romeo and Juliet by Shakespeare, Headlong, UK Tour (2012)
 Decade, devised with Rupert Goold, Headlong, St Katharine Docks (2011)

Honours 
Icke became the youngest ever winner of the Laurence Olivier Award for Best Director in 2016.

Icke was elected Fellow of the Royal Society of Literature in its "40 Under 40" initiative in June 2018.

Awards and nominations

References

 

1986 births
Alumni of King's College, Cambridge
Living people
English theatre directors
Laurence Olivier Award winners
Fellows of the Royal Society of Literature